Grupo Desportivo Torralta (abbreviated as GD Torralta) was a Portuguese football club based in Portimão situated in the Algarve.

Background
GD Torralta folded at the end of the 1987/1988 season when they finished third in Terceira Divisão Série F which was the third tier of Portuguese football at that time.   The club was founded in 1934 and they played their home matches at the Estádio Dois Irmãos in Portimão.

The club was affiliated to Associação de Futebol do Algarve and also entered the Taça de Portugal completing 13 matches in the competition.

Season to season

Honours
Terceira Divisão: 1983–84 (Série F Winners)

Footnotes

Football clubs in Portugal
Association football clubs established in 1934
1934 establishments in Portugal
1988 disestablishments in Portugal